George Hicks may refer to:

 George Hicks (trade unionist) (1879–1954), British trade unionist and politician
 George Hicks (footballer) (1902–?), English footballer
 George Elgar Hicks (1824–1914), English painter
 George Hicks (aviator) (1900–1951), World War I flying ace
 George Hicks (broadcast journalist) (1905–1965), American war correspondent
 George L. Hicks, college football player and colonel in the U. S. Army
 George Dawes Hicks (1862–1941),  British philosopher

See also
 George Hickes (disambiguation)